A House on the Bayou is a 2021 American horror film written and directed by Alex McAulay. It stars Paul Schneider, Angela Sarafyan, Jacob Lofland, Lia McHugh, Doug Van Liew, and Lauren Richards. Jason Blum serves as an executive producer through his Blumhouse Television banner.

The film was released on November 19, 2021, on digital by Paramount Home Entertainment and streaming on Epix.

Plot
Jessica Chambers confronts her husband John over an affair. John admits to seeing Vivienne Ballard, one of his students. John agrees to end the relationship with Vivienne, and to not tell anything about it to their daughter, Anna. He agrees to go on vacation with Jess and Anna to help mend their family.

The family travels to a house on the Louisiana bayou that Jessica manages through her job as a realtor. The family will vacation at the home while Jess prepares it for the market. Jessica and John argue over what to have for dinner, with Jess wanting veal. Jess then sends John and Anna to the grocery store. While there, Anna flirts with a boy named Isaac. The store owner writes a cryptic message on John's receipt that says: "The devil is watching you." John lies to Anna that the veal Jess wanted was not available, and they leave the store.

Isaac soon appears at the house and manipulates Jessica and John into inviting him and his Grandpappy, the store owner, in to cook a veal dinner, exposing John's lie. Over dinner, Isaac is hostile towards John and psychologically tortures the three family members with vague threats. Grandpappy explains that Isaac is a mysterious force, and he plays a record while Isaac is away. The disc plays a conversation that reveals John planned to leave his family for Vivienne. John denies this and is goaded into going outside with Isaac, where it is revealed that John paid Isaac and Grandpappy to murder Jess. Isaac implies he is controlling things now, while inside, Grandpappy insists John is a poor husband and father.

Upon his return, Jess tells John she is divorcing him and that she sees through his gaslighting. Isaac tricks John into entering a room and locks him in. Vivienne shows up at the front door, lured there by Isaac using John's phone. Grandpappy forces Anna at gunpoint to burn Vivienne, who is locked in her car, for her transgressions; Jess burns her instead. In the chaos, John is killed by a coyote inside the locked room, and Jess murders Grandpappy. Isaac threatens to take Anna for his wife, claiming that he has been alive for centuries, has been to hell, and is unsure if he is an angel or a demon. When he reaches for Anna, Jess kills him.

Jessica and Anna go to Vierge County's Sheriff Torres to report events, but upon returning to the site, they find the house gone and the terrain vacantexcept for John's wedding ring on the (now) field of grass. On the ride back to the station, Torres pulls over to let the perfectly fine Isaac and Grandpappy drive by in their truck. Torres confirms that Isaac and Grandpappy are not human, they clean the town of evil-doers and sinners, and Jess should take her survival as a boon and never return to the town.

Cast

 Angela Sarafyan as Jessica
 Paul Schneider as John
 Lia McHugh as Anna
 Jacob Lofland as Isaac
 Doug Van Liew as Grandpappy
 Lauren Richards as Vivienne
 Rhonda Johnson Dents as Sheriff Torres

Production
In March 2021, was announced that Alex McAulay would write and direct the television horror thriller film A House on the Bayou. The film is the first of eight films that Blumhouse Television will develop and produce exclusively for cable network Epix. On March 29, 2021, it was announced that Lia McHugh joined the cast of the film. Paul Schneider, Angela Sarafyan, Jacob Lofland, Doug Van Liew and Lauren Richards were cast in April.

Principal photography took place from March 22 to April 19, 2021, in New Orleans.

Release
The film was released on November 19, 2021, on digital by Paramount Home Entertainment and on Epix.

References

External links
 

2021 films
2021 horror thriller films
2020s American films
2020s English-language films
American horror thriller films
Blumhouse Productions films
MGM+ original films
Films set in Louisiana
Films shot in New Orleans